The Unlicense is a public domain equivalent license for software which provides a public domain waiver with a fall-back public-domain-like license, similar to the CC Zero for cultural works. It includes language used in earlier software projects and has a focus on an anti-copyright message.

License terms
The text of the Unlicense is as follows:

Reception
The Free Software Foundation states that "Both public domain works and the lax license provided by the Unlicense are compatible with the GNU GPL." However, for dedicating software to the public domain it recommends CC0 over the Unlicense, stating that CC0 "is more thorough and mature than the Unlicense".

Google does not allow contributions to projects under public domain equivalent licenses like the Unlicense (and CC0), while allowing contributions to 0BSD licensed and US government PD projects.

Notable projects that use the Unlicense include youtube-dl, Second Reality, and the source code of the 1995 video game Gloom.

History

In a post published on January 1 (Public Domain Day), 2010, Arto Bendiken, the author of the Unlicense, outlined his reasons for preferring public domain software, namely: the nuisance of dealing with licensing terms (for instance license incompatibility), the threat inherent in copyright law, and the impracticability of copyright law.

On January 23, 2010, Bendiken followed-up on his initial post. In this post, he explained that the Unlicense is based on the copyright waiver of SQLite with the no-warranty statement from the MIT License. He then walked through the license, commenting on each part.

In a post published in December 2010, Bendiken further clarified what it means to "license" and "unlicense" software.

In December 2010, Mike Linksvayer, the vice president of Creative Commons at the time, wrote in an identi.ca conversation "I like the movement" in speaking of the Unlicense effort, considering it compatible with the goals of the CC Zero (CC0) license, released in 2009.
On January 1, 2011, Bendiken reviewed the progress and adoption of the Unlicense, saying it was "difficult to give estimates of current Unlicense adoption" but there were "many hundreds of projects using the Unlicense".

In January 2012, when discussed on OSI's license-review mailing list, the Unlicense was brushed off as a crayon license. In particular, it was criticized for being possibly inconsistent and non-standard, and for making it difficult for some projects to accept Unlicensed code as third-party contributions; leaving too much room for interpretation; and possibly being incoherent in some legal systems. A request for legacy approval was filed in March 2020, which led to a formal approval in June 2020, with an acknowledgement of a "general agreement that the document is poorly drafted".

In 2015, GitHub reported that approximately 102,000 of their 5.1 million licensed projects (2% of licensed projects on GitHub.com) used the Unlicense.

Until 2022, the Fedora Project recommended CC0 over the Unlicense because the former is "a more comprehensive legal text". However, in July 2022, the CC0 license became unsupported and software to be released in the Fedora distribution must not be under CC0, due to CC0 not waiving patent rights.

See also
 WTFPL
 Comparison of free and open-source software licenses

References

External links
 
 Official mailing list

Software licenses
Public-domain software